Pacific Lutheran Jr. / Sr. High School is a private Lutheran high school located in Gardena, California.

External links
 Official website

Educational institutions established in 1996
Lutheran schools in California
High schools in Los Angeles County, California
Private high schools in California
Secondary schools affiliated with the Lutheran Church–Missouri Synod
1996 establishments in California